Pontohedyle verrucosa is a species of sea slug, an acochlidian, a shell-less marine gastropod mollusc in the family Microhedylidae.

References

External links
 

Microhedylidae
Gastropods described in 1970